Lee So-young may refer to:

 Lee So-young (artist) (born 1973), South Korean comic artist
 Esom (born Lee So-young, 1990), South Korean actress and model
 Lee So-young (volleyball) (born 1994), South Korean volleyball player
Lee So-young (lawyer) (born 1985), South Korean lawyer and politician

See also
 Lee (Korean surname)
 So-young, Korean feminine given name